Grove Hill may refer to:

Australia
 Grove Hill, Northern Territory

United Kingdom
 Grove Hill, Middlesbrough, North Yorkshire
 Grove Hill, Hemel Hempstead, Hertfordshire

United States
 Grove Hill, Alabama, a town
 Grove Hill Courthouse Square Historic District
 Grove Hill Municipal Airport
 Grove Hill, Virginia

See also 
 Grove Hill Cemetery, a cemetery in Waltham, Massachusetts
 Grove Hill Mansion, a historic mansion in Northampton, Massachusetts